Charroux is a commune in the Vienne department in the Nouvelle-Aquitaine region in western France.

The remains of the Benedictine Charroux Abbey, founded in the 8th century, are preserved in the town. Said to be the site of the council of Charroux in 989 where the bishops of Aquitaine met to protect the immunity of the clergy and suggested that the church should guarantee that the poor might live in peace.

Demographics

See also
Communes of the Vienne department

References

Communes of Vienne